The 1887 college football season had no clear-cut champion, with the Official NCAA Division I Football Records Book listing Yale as having been selected national champions.  In the West, the 1887 Michigan Wolverines football team compiled a 5–0 record, including three wins over Notre Dame (who was playing its first game ever and did not have a varsity team yet ), and outscored its opponents by a combined score of 102 to 10. On November 13, college football was first played in the state of Virginia when the Virginia Cavaliers and Pantops Academy fought to a scoreless tie.

Statistical leaders
Player scoring most points: Knowlton Ames, Princeton, 219

Conference standings
The following is a potentially incomplete list of conference standings:

Independents

References